Battus lycidas is a species of butterfly in the family Papilionidae native to the Neotropical realm. It is commonly known as Cramer's swallowtail, the Lycidas swallowtail, and the yellow-trailed swallowtail.

Description
The wingspan of Battus lycidas can reach . Wings are basically black, with yellow markings and a greenish structure-colour. The hind wings are tailless. This species shows a sexual dimorphism, as in males hind wings have anal androconial creamy yellow patches and the abdomen is yellow cream, while in the females hind wings have faint pale yellow spots forming a discontinuous strip in the middle area. Little is known about this species, but it is not considered threatened. Adults fly in May and June visiting flowers of Warscewiczia coccinea (Rubiaceae) and blooms of  Vochysia guatemalensis (Vochysiaceae). The larvae of Battus lycidas feed on Aristolochia huberiana. and on Aristolochia constricta.

Distribution
This species can be found from Mexico to northern Bolivia and southern Pará, Brazil. It is rare in Costa Rica.

Habitat

References

Further reading
 
Edwin Möhn, 1999, Butterflies of the World 5: 7, plate 10, figures 7-8, plate 19, figures 5-6.Edwin Möhn, 2002 Schmetterlinge der Erde, Butterflies of the world Part V (5), Papilionidae II:Battus. Edited by Erich Bauer and Thomas Frankenbach Keltern : Goecke & Evers ; Canterbury : Hillside Books., Page 8, plate 8, figures 5-8, plate 18, figures 7-8
Paul Smart, 1976 The Illustrated Encyclopedia of the Butterfly World in Color.London, Salamander:Encyclopedie des papillons. Lausanne, Elsevier Sequoia (French language edition)  page 159 fig. 15 (Guatemala)

External links

Butterfly Corner
Species of Costa Rica

lycidas
Butterflies of North America
Papilionidae of South America
Butterflies described in 1777